The 1910 Miami Redskins football team was an American football team that represented Miami University  as an independent during the 1910 college football season. Led by coach Harold Iddings in his second and final year, Miami compiled a 2–4–1 record.

Schedule

Notes

References

Miami
Miami RedHawks football seasons
Miami Redskins football